The Truro by-election 1878 was a parliamentary by-election held for the House of Commons of the United Kingdom constituency of Truro on 26 September 1878.

Vacancy
The by-election was fought due to the death of the incumbent Conservative MP, Sir Frederick Williams.

The result
It was won by the Conservative candidate Arthur Tremayne.

References

1878 elections in the United Kingdom
1878 in England
19th century in Cornwall
Politics of Truro
By-elections to the Parliament of the United Kingdom in Cornish constituencies
September 1878 events